Tongbulgyo is a school of "interpenetrated Buddhism" which was taught by the Korean monk Wonhyo.

See also
Ijangui
Essence-Function
Buddhism in Korea
Traditional Korean thought

References
 

Schools of Buddhism founded in Korea